Renato Guilas Agustin (born August 1, 1963) is a Filipino former professional basketball player, politician, and current assistant coach for the San Miguel Beermen. He played college basketball for the Lyceum of the Philippines before moving on to play professional basketball in the Philippine Basketball Association (PBA).

Basketball career

Professional career
Agustin was the Most Valuable Player awardee of the PBA in 1992. He played for the San Miguel Beermen, Sunkist/Pop Cola, Mobiline Phone Pals, Sta. Lucia Realtors, and finally, Batang Red Bull. Agustin was named a member of the PBA's 25 Greatest Players in 2000. He also had a brief stint in with the Pampanga Dragons in the Metropolitan Basketball Association.

A shooting guard since his amateur days with RFM-Swift Corporation of the Philippine Basketball League, Agustin saw limited minutes during his rookie season with the grandslam-winning San Miguel Beermen in 1989, playing backup to his more illustrious teammates Samboy Lim and Elmer Reyes.  However, beginning the 1990 season, he became a regular part of the Beermen's backcourt rotation with the departure of Reyes to expansion team Pop-Cola (RFM) and constant injuries to Lim and Hector Calma. Coach Norman Black would sometimes play Agustin at point guard until he became an adept combo guard.

National team career
Agustin represented the Philippine national basketball team at the 1994 Asian Games.

Coaching career
He is the former head coach of the San Sebastian Golden Stags men's basketball team in the NCAA, having taken over from Jorge Gallent in 2009, and winning a championship in the same year. In 2010, he became head coach of his former PBA team, the San Miguel Beermen. During the 2011 PBA Governors' Cup, Agustin steered the team (then known as the Petron Blaze Boosters) to the championship, defeating the Talk 'N Text Tropang Texters in seven games. He became the 9th coach in PBA history to win a title in his first year as head coach.

On July 25, 2013, San Miguel Corporation, owner of Petron Blaze Boosters and Barangay Ginebra San Miguel, announced the appointment of Agustin as interim coach of Barangay Ginebra San Miguel for the 2013 PBA Governor's Cup.

On January 5, 2015, Barangay Ginebra team manager Alfrancis Chua announced during the team's practice the reappointment of Agustin as head coach of the team. This was after former coach Jeffrey Cariaso's attempt to end Ginebra's PBA championship drought failed after two conferences. After a quarterfinal finish in the Commissioner's Cup, Agustin was fired as the head coach of Ginebra and was replaced by assistant coach Frankie Lim. Following his termination, he returned to San Miguel Beermen as an assistant coach.

Coaching record

Collegiate record

PBA

References 

1963 births
Living people
Barako Bull Energy Boosters players
Basketball players at the 1994 Asian Games
Basketball players from Pampanga
Filipino men's basketball coaches
Kapampangan people
People from San Fernando, Pampanga
Philippine Basketball Association All-Stars
Barangay Ginebra San Miguel coaches
Philippines men's national basketball team players
Filipino men's basketball players
Point guards
Pop Cola Panthers players
Shooting guards
San Miguel Beermen players
Sta. Lucia Realtors players
Asian Games competitors for the Philippines
Filipino sportsperson-politicians
Liberal Party (Philippines) politicians
Lyceum Pirates basketball players
San Miguel Beermen draft picks
Filipino Roman Catholics
21st-century Filipino politicians
San Miguel Beermen coaches
San Sebastian Stags basketball coaches